Newsholme may refer to:

 Sir Arthur Newsholme, public health expert
Newsholme, Bradford, West Yorkshire England
Newsholme, East Riding of Yorkshire, England
Newsholme, Lancashire, England